Victoria Mill is a Grade II* listed nineteenth century cotton spinning mill in Miles Platting, Manchester. It was a double mill designed by George Woodhouse completed in 1869.

It was built alongside the Rochdale Canal and Varley Street, Victoria Mills were constructed for William Holland & Sons, of the Adelphi Mill, Salford. It was designed by George Woodhouse of Bolton. It was designed as a six storey double mill with shared engine house. It had an octagonal chimney. It was acquired by the Fine Cotton Spinners and Doublers Association in 1898 and worked to 1960, and has now been converted into office space and residential.

See also

Grade II* listed buildings in Greater Manchester
Listed buildings in Manchester-M40

References

External links
 Cottontown.org website
 Spinningtheweb.org website

Textile mills in Manchester
Cotton mills
Cotton industry in England
Former textile mills in the United Kingdom
Grade II* listed buildings in Manchester
Grade II* listed industrial buildings